The General Coordination of the Presidential Air Transport Unit  is the main Mexican Presidential  transport unit. Mexico's President uses mainly a Boeing 757-225 ordered by President 
Miguel de la Madrid built in 1987 exclusively for this purpose. The plane's official callsign when the president is inboard is TP-01, which stands for Transporte Presidencial 1 (Presidential Transport 1). President Felipe Calderón ordered a new Boeing 787-8 at a cost of 218 million dollars, which has been delivered on February 2 2016 to substitute the aging 757 and will be in service until 2040. When flying into airports with short runways, he uses either a Boeing 737-33A (TP-02) or a Boeing 737-322 (TP-03). For short trips he uses a Super Puma VIP edition called TPH-01 which stands for Transporte Presidencial Helicoptero 1 (Helicopter Presidential Transport 1). Before the 737s and the 757, two Boeing 727-100 were used as presidential transport. The current presidential fleet as of 2008 is as follows:

Executive branch of the government of Mexico